Trial was a ship that first appears in 1808 and that was seized by convicts and eventually wrecked on the Mid North Coast of New South Wales, Australia in 1816.

Trial was a brig owned by the merchant Simeon Lord. While waiting near the Sow and Pigs Reef in Port Jackson for good winds to take her to Port Dalrymple, she was seized by a group of thirteen convicts. The survivors of the wreck constructed a new boat out of the ship's remains but, according to the local aborigines, the boat capsized and all thirteen convicts drowned. The convicts abandoned at Trial Bay William Bennett (Trials master), his crew, and some passengers, numbering eight or ten in total (including a woman and child). These survivors attempted to walk back to Sydney but disappeared without trace.

On 12 January 1817,  was dispatched from Newcastle, under the command of Thomas Whyte, to search for Trial. Whyte was successful; on 14 January he found Trial'''s remains, which consisted of a canvas tent and smashed timbers.

Stories of a white woman living in a wretched state among the aborigines persisted; she was believed perhaps to have been a stowaway on Trial. In 1831, a reward was offered for restoration of such a survivor of Trial''. As a result, a woman was found who was said to be the captain's wife, Emily Bardon, but 14 years of living wild had left her demented, and she died soon after being reunited with her relations.

Citations
3. The Rescue of Emily Bardon https://trove.nla.gov.au/newspaper/article/164369539/16909915

Shipwrecks of the Mid North Coast Region
Port Stephens Council
Brigs of Australia
Individual sailing vessels
Maritime incidents in 1816
1816 in Australia
1788–1850 ships of Australia
Merchant ships of Australia
Convict ships to New South Wales